New Mexico Association of Student Councils (NMASC) is a student leadership organization in the state of New Mexico. It offers leadership training experiences, resources and networking opportunities for students and advisers all across the Land of Enchantment. The NMASC is sponsored by the New Mexico Association of Secondary School Principals as well as the New Mexico Activities Association.

General information
The New Mexico Association of Student Councils is composed of five districts across the state of New Mexico. The five districts are Central District; Northeast District; Northwest District; Southeast District; and Southwest District. The NMASC sponsors a variety of activities that are available to all member schools. Activities include an annual conference held at a chosen member school, summer workshops that are held at the New Mexico Tech, fall district workshops, and additional activities.

Executive Board
The NMASC's governing body is composed of an executive board consisting of an Executive Director, an Adviser to the President, an Adviser to the 1st Vice-President, an Adviser to the 2nd Vice-President, and an Adviser to the Secretary, as well as four state officers.

There is an appointed Executive Director who is hired by the New Mexico Association of Secondary Principals with recommendation from the NMASC Executive Board
State officers are student leaders elected by member schools to serve as the NMASC's State President, 1st Vice President, 2nd Vice President, and Secretary. All state officers serve for a term of one year beginning with their installation at the State Conference.

State Conference
The NMASC State Conference is held each February at a selected member school. Each year, member schools send delegates to the conference to enhance their leadership skills, hear motivational speakers and network with other student leaders from throughout the state.

State conference locations and themes

Summer Leadership Workshop

Each Summer, the NMASC hosts a Summer Leadership Workshop that occurs usually the last week in July at the UNM Campus in Albuquerque. Attendees here, learn the values of leadership, responsibility, and effective roles of being great leaders in their schools. Since 2012, the annual Summer Leadership Workshop has been held at New Mexico Tech in Socorro.

References

External links
NMASC Online
Constitution

Non-profit organizations based in New Mexico
Youth organizations based in New Mexico
Student governments in the United States
Education in New Mexico